Fall of Berlin may refer to 

 Fall of Berlin (1806), in 1806 French forces captured Berlin during the Napoleonic Wars
Battle of Berlin (1945), when the city of Berlin was captured by the Red Army
The Fall of Berlin (film), Soviet film in two parts directed by Mikheil Chiaureli. It was released in 1950 by the Mosfilm Studio and is about the Battle of Berlin
Fall of Berlin – 1945, a Soviet documentary film about the Battle of Berlin, directed by Yuli Raizman and Yelizaveta Svilova